Thomas Templeton Murray  (20 November 1891 – 28 July 1966) was a New Zealand politician of the National Party.

Biography

Murray was born in Largs, Scotland, in 1891, and he received his education in his home country. He came to New Zealand in circa 1910. During World War I he served in the New Zealand Expeditionary Force and was awarded the Military Cross and Military Medal for his actions. After the conclusion of World War I he took up a soldier resettlement farm in Huiroa. His farm performed well and he was able to use profits to purchase a second farm in Toko in 1928.

He was involved in community affairs as a justice of the peace, Stratford Borough Councillor, chairman of the Taranaki Education Board and Licensing Authority as well as president of Federated Farmers. He supported the establishment of the National Party and founded the Stratford electoral division of the National Party, also being electorate chairman from 1936 to 1939.

In 1939 he rejoined the army and served in World War II. By the close of the war he had reached the rank of colonel.

He represented the Stratford electorate from 1954, and he retired in 1963. David Thomson succeeded him in Stratford.

Murray died on 28 July 1966, and he was buried at Kopuatama Cemetery, Stratford.

Notes

References

|-

1891 births
1966 deaths
People from Largs
Scottish emigrants to New Zealand
New Zealand military personnel of World War I
New Zealand recipients of the Military Cross
New Zealand recipients of the Military Medal
New Zealand farmers
New Zealand justices of the peace
Local politicians in New Zealand
20th-century New Zealand politicians
New Zealand military personnel of World War II
New Zealand National Party MPs
Members of the New Zealand House of Representatives
New Zealand MPs for North Island electorates
Burials at Kopuatama Cemetery